is a Japanese footballer currently playing as a centre back for Tochigi SC, on loan from Shonan Bellmare.

Career statistics

Club

Notes

References

External links

2000 births
Living people
Association football people from Fukuoka Prefecture
Japanese footballers
Association football defenders
J1 League players
J3 League players
Shonan Bellmare players
Fukushima United FC players